The Murg is a  long tributary of the Thur in Switzerland. It rises in the canton of St. Gallen, flows through the canton of Thurgau, and joins the Thur near Warth.

Along its route, the river flows through the communities of Mosnang, Fischingen, Sirnach, Münchwilen, Wängi, Stettfurt, Matzingen and Frauenfeld. Between Münchwilen and Frauenfeld the river is closely followed by the Frauenfeld–Wil railway line.

External links 
 
 Hydrographic data of the Murg on the FOEN website (in German)

Rivers of Switzerland
1Murg
Rivers of the canton of St. Gallen